Arrowsmith is a town in the Mid West region of Western Australia.

References

Towns in Western Australia
Shire of Irwin